The Kansas–Armenia National Guard Partnership is one of 25 European partnerships that make-up the U.S. European Command State Partnership Program and one of 88 worldwide partnerships that make-up the National Guard State Partnership Program. The Republic of Armenia signed a bilateral affairs agreement with the U.S. Department of Defense and the state of Kansas in 2003 establishing the Kansas-Armenia State Partnership Program.  Kansas Gov. Kathleen Sebelius subsequently signed a proclamation declaring June 18, 2004, as Kansas-Armenia Partnership Day.

The partnership aims to develop self-sustaining relationships between the Armenian Ministry of Defense and the Kansas National Guard as well as various civilian organizations in order to exchange knowledge in areas such as emergency management and disaster response, border and port security, economic security, peacekeeping operations and counter terrorism.

History
Armenia declared its independence from the Soviet Union on August 23, 1990, having previously been the Armenian Soviet Socialist Republic, one of the constituent republics of the USSR since 1936, and part of the Transcaucasian Soviet Federated Socialist Republic since 1920. In the wake of the August Coup (1991), a referendum was held on the question of secession. Following an overwhelming vote in favor, full independence was declared on September 21, 1991. However, widespread recognition did not occur until the formal dissolution of the Soviet Union on December 25, 1991. The dissolution of the Soviet Union brought an end to the Cold War and created the opportunity for bilateral relations with the New Independent States (NIS) as they began a political and economic transformation. The U.S. recognized the independence of Armenia on December 25, 1991, and opened an embassy in Yerevan in February 1992.

The Kansas-Armenia State Partnership was established in June 2003 for the purpose of fostering security cooperation between the United States and Armenia and to support the objectives of the Supreme Headquarters Allied Powers Europe.  Each year, Kansas and Armenia conducts numerous joint exercises in both locations that span across educational, law enforcement, medical, military, and emergency preparedness endeavors. Within the framework of the Ambassador's Mission Strategic Resource Plan (MSRP) and EUCOM's Theater Security Strategy, the Kansas-Armenia Partnership strengthens bilateral security relationships, enhances partner capacity and promotes effective civil-military relations.

Twice a year, in January and July, the State Partnership Program hosts the International Officers visit from Command and General Staff College, Fort Leavenworth, Kan. This is a state government visit to Topeka to familiarize international officers with the judicial, legislative and executive branches of state government; including the role of the National Guard. Other military cooperation events focus on enhancing U.S. military standards and procedures, as well as enhancing interoperability between Euro-Atlantic and Armenian forces. Annually, the program continues efforts to expand beyond the military-to-military relationships. Civil engagement initiatives started in 2008 in the areas of higher education and police/law enforcement and have begun to show tangible results. Expanding on the efforts started in education, Kansas partnered with the Bureau of International Narcotics and Law Enforcement within the U.S. Embassy in Armenia to begin conducting law enforcement related events similar to the military events the Kansas National Guard has been conducting.

Partnership focus
The following are EUCOM stated areas of focus for the Kansas-Armenia partnership:
 Foster regional stability
 Assist with Strategic Defense Reform
 Increase NATO interoperability
 Strengthen multilateral military cooperation
 Increase Armenian coalition contributions
 Enhance Expeditionary Medical Capabilities
 Enhance Peace Keeping Brigade Capabilities
 Improve Demining Capabilities

Funding
The U.S. has made a concerted effort to help Armenia during its difficult transition from totalitarianism and a command economy to democracy and open markets.  The monetary value of assistance provided by Office of Defense Cooperation (ODC) and State Department defense related programs is mandated by Congress and fluctuates slightly each year. Over the last 4 years, International Military Education and Training (IMET) for Armenia has amounted to approximately 3.2 million US Dollars. This has provided military education and language training for over 100 Officers, NCOs and junior enlisted soldiers. Foreign Military Financing (FMF) for Armenia has amounted to approximately 17.5 million US dollars. FMF has been used to promote professional military education, deployable medicine and enhancing the Armenian Peace Keeping Brigade. Humanitarian Assistance (HA) for Armenia has amounted to nearly one million US Dollars provided to schools, hospitals and orphanages throughout Armenia.

International organizations and agreements 
UN, Council of Europe, European Neighborhood Program of the EU, Organization for Security and Cooperation in Europe (OSCE), Commonwealth of Independent States (CIS), NATO's Partnership for Peace, Collective Security Treaty Organization (CSTO), Euro-Atlantic Partnership Council, World Trade Organization.

U.S. assistance supports Armenia's transition into a stable partner at peace with its neighbors. The United States provides multifaceted assistance to Armenia through a variety of programs designed to promote economic growth, encourage democratic governance, improve health and social protection systems, and enhance Armenia's peace and security as well as providing humanitarian assistance to the poor, elderly, and other vulnerable groups through a "whole of government" approach that involves a number of U.S. government agencies.

The Conventional Armed Forces in Europe (CFE) Treaty, limiting military equipment, was ratified by the Armenian parliament in July 1992. In March 1993, Armenia signed the multilateral Chemical Weapons Convention, for the eventual elimination of chemical weapons. Armenia became a non-nuclear state under the  Non-Proliferation Treaty in July 1993. In July 2008 the U.S. and Armenia signed an action plan to partner on Combating Smuggling of Nuclear and Radiological Materials under the U.S. Department of State's Nuclear Smuggling Outreach Initiative (NSOI). In the same framework, Armenia is participating in the U.S.-led Preventing Nuclear Smuggling Program (PNSP). Armenia also participates in the Global Initiative to Counter Nuclear Terrorism (GICNT).

In September 2010, Armenia and the United States signed an agreement to implement a Biological Threat Reduction Program, which will enhance U.S.-Armenia cooperation in preventing the proliferation of technology, pathogens, and expertise that could be used in the development of biological weapons. Armenia provides troops for peacekeeping operations elsewhere and has an Acquisition and Cross-Servicing Agreement and an Agreement on Cooperation of Defense and Economy with the U.S., and a Status of Forces agreement is in place.

References

External links

 The EUCOM State Partnership page for Kansas-Armenia
 The Kansas National Guard SPP
 EUCOM SPP
 National Guard Bureau SPP
 National Guard Bureau SPP News Archives

National Guard (United States)
Military alliances involving the United States
Armenia–United States military relations